Agriphila aeneociliella, the eastern grass veneer, is a species of moth in the family Crambidae. It is found from Denmark, Poland, Ukraine and Romania through Russia to Manchuria, northern China, Korea and Japan.

The wingspan is 10–12 mm.

References

Moths described in 1844
Crambini
Moths of Europe
Moths of Asia